Killer Net is a British television crime drama mini series, first broadcast on Channel 4 in May 1998. The drama was written and produced by Lynda La Plante, directed by Geoffrey Sax and featured a cast of up and coming actors. One of the main selling points of the series was that it starred Jason Orange of Take That, but it was also one of the introductions to the small screen of Paul Bettany.

Plot
The series is set around the lives of three students living in Brighton, whose contribution to an internet-based computer game leads them right into the heart of an investigation into a serial killer.

Cast
 Tam Williams as Scott Miller
 Paul Bettany as Joe Hunter
 Emily Woof as Suzie Scott
 Zoe Lucker as Carol Butler
 Jason Orange as Brent Moyer
 Sara Stephens as Tracy Wilson
 Kathy Brolly as Charlotte 'Charlie' Thorpe
 Mark Tandy as Robin Butler-Cooke
 Simon Meacock as Tony 'Scruffy' O'Reilly
 Christopher Neame as DCI Collingwood
 Richard McCabe as DI George Colby
 Stephen Boxer as DS Hawkes
 Raquel Cassidy as WPC Pamela Boxer
 Mark Barton Hill as Jamie 
 Mark Denham as Jarvis

Production

Locations
Location filming for Killer Net was completed throughout the late summer of 1997. Many scenes were filmed in Brighton, East Sussex. Scenes set on the actual game "Killer Net" were all filmed in Islington, in and around the Camden Passage antique area. The University that the students attend is not Brighton University, but it is in fact the University of Surrey in Guildford.

Up until the end of the 1990s, Eastern Terrace in Kemp Town, Brighton was used as student lodgings. and number eight was used as the property where the students live. It has since been converted back into accommodation and is one of the most expensive properties in Brighton.

The club featured in the programme is The Zap club in the Kings Road Arches, Brighton. The Casino is actually the Holiday Inn opposite the West Pier on Kings Road and later doubles as the block of flats in which Brent Moyer (Jason Orange) lives. The road in which the police question Scott about his car is Princess Street, Brighton, outside the Marlborough Pub. There are various invaluable scenes filmed inside the West Pier pavilion. The Palace Pier has many scenes filmed on it. When the students go out celebrating after winning the game, the MG is pictured turning from Marine Parade into the Old Steine. The opening shot from Scott's window is a view down Marine Parade and shows the forecourt of the Bristol Bar in Paston Place.

Episodes

References

External links 

Sing-Along-A-Killer-Net
Official Site on Internet Archive

1998 British television series debuts
1998 British television series endings
1990s British drama television series
Channel 4 television dramas
1990s British crime television series
1990s British television miniseries
British thriller television series
English-language television shows
Films directed by Geoffrey Sax
Television shows set in Brighton